Faveoolithus is an oogenus of dinosaur egg. The oogenus contains two oospecies, F. ningxiaensis and F. zhangi.

Distribution 
Fossil eggs of Faveoolithus have been found in:
 Chahanaobao and the Turonian Gaogou Formation, China
 Campanian Barun Goyot Formation, Mongolia
 Santonian Seonso Conglomerate, South Korea

See also 
 List of dinosaur oogenera

References

Bibliography 

 M. Huh and D. K. Zelenitsky. 2002. Rich dinosaur nesting site from the Cretaceous of Bosung County, Chullanam-do Province, South Korea. Journal of Vertebrate Paleontology 22(3):716-718
 Carpenter, K. 1999. Eggs, Nests, and Baby Dinosaurs: A Look at Dinosaur Reproduction (Life of the Past). Indiana University Press, Bloomington, Indiana
 K. Mikhailov, K. Sabath, and S. Kurzanov. 1994. Eggs and nests from the Cretaceous of Mongolia. In K. Carpenter, K. F. Hirsch, and J. R. Horner (eds.), Dinosaur Eggs and Babies, Cambridge University Press, Cambridge 88-115
 Z.-K. Zhao. 1994. In K. Carpenter, K. F. Hirsch, and J. R. Horner (eds.), Dinosaur Eggs and Babies, Cambridge University Press, Cambridge. In K. Carpenter, K. F. Hirsch, and J. R. Horner (eds.), Dinosaur Eggs and Babies, Cambridge University Press, Cambridge 184-203
 Z. Zhao and S. Ding. 1976. [Discovery of the dinosaurian egg-shells from Alxa, Ningxia and its stratigraphical significance]. Vertebrata PalAsiatica 14(2):42-44

Dinosaur reproduction
Turonian life
Coniacian life
Santonian life
Campanian life
Late Cretaceous dinosaurs of Asia
Cretaceous China
Fossils of China
Cretaceous Mongolia
Fossils of Mongolia
Cretaceous South Korea
Fossils of South Korea
Fossil parataxa described in 1976